In 1892 the French omnibus Navigation and Commerce issue of postage stamps included types specifically intended for use in the island of Anjouan. These were inscribed "SULTANAT / D'ANJOUAN". A series of surcharged values issued in 1912 was available for use in Madagascar and all of the Comoros, and thereafter stamps of Madagascar were used. In 1950 Anjouan used the stamps of the Comoros.

Sources 
 Stanley Gibbons Ltd: various catalogues
 Encyclopaedia of Postal History
Rossiter, Stuart & John Flower. The Stamp Atlas. London: Macdonald, 1986.

See also
Postage stamps and postal history of the Comoros
Postage stamps and postal history of Madagascar

Anjouan
Philately of France
History of the Comoros
Anjouan